List of the Orders, decorations and medals of Sudan.
 
For the awards instituted after 1961 and it is amendement in 1976 and 1993, which stipulates it is not permissible to repeat awarding of decorations and medals, or to rise from one class to a higher one, except after the lapse of at least three years from the date of awarding them. This period is reduced to one year for employees if they are referred to retirement, and the Sports Medal is excluded from the period condition. Orders and medals remain the property of the awardee, and their heirs as a souvenir without any of them having the right to carry it. Without prejudice to any other punishment stipulated in the laws of Sudan, it is permissible, by order of the President of the Republic, to strip the bearer of a necklace, sash, medal, medallion, cloak of honour, or belt if they commit an act that is dishonourable or inconsistent with loyalty to the state.
 
No Sudanese may carry any foreign decoration or medal except after obtaining written permission from the President of the Republic. Any Sudanese who holds foreign decorations or medals that were awarded to him before the first of January 1956 may continue to carry them without the need to obtain the said permission. It is not permissible to carry foreign decorations and medals that have been revoked by the awarding country.

Discontinued awards

Anglo-Egyptian invasion of Sudan awards

1933 Defence Force awards

1948 Police and Prison Service awards

1956 Sudan independence-related awards

1969 cop d’état related medals

References 

Orders, decorations, and medals of Sudan